Mushmouth may refer to:
 Mushmouth, a character from the comic strip Moon Mullins
 Mushmouth, a character from the animated cartoon Fat Albert and the Cosby Kids
 Norwegian sea bass, particularly those native to Flekkefjord
 Skipjack tuna
 Mushmouth may also refer to the character Mushmouth Thomas frequently featured on The Dunham and Miller Show on The Ticket in Dallas